Ľubomír Tupta (born 27 March 1998) is a Slovak professional footballer who plays for Czech club Slovan Liberec on loan from the Italian club Pescara, as a forward.

Club career
Tupta made his professional debut for Hellas Verona in a 4–0 Serie A loss to Udinese on 23 December 2017.

In January 2020, he agreed a contract extension until 2023 and joined Wisła Kraków on loan.

On 5 October 2020, he joined Serie B club Ascoli on loan.

In February 2021, Tupta's loan in Ascoli ended abruptly after a series of transfers that would have left him sidelined. He was immediately loaned out to Swiss Super League club FC Sion on a half-season loan per wishes of the Sion manager Fabio Grosso.

On 1 September 2022, Tupta signed with Pescara. On 2 February 2023, he returned to Slovan Liberec on loan with an option to buy.

International career
Tupta was first recognised in a senior national team nomination when coach Pavel Hapal named him as an alternate forward for a UEFA Euro 2020 qualifying double fixture in March 2019 against Hungary and Wales.

References

External links
 Ľubomír Tupta at Futbalnet.sk 
 
 

1998 births
Sportspeople from Prešov
Living people
Association football forwards
Slovak footballers
Slovakia youth international footballers
Slovakia under-21 international footballers
Hellas Verona F.C. players
Wisła Kraków players
Ascoli Calcio 1898 F.C. players
FC Sion players
FC Slovan Liberec players
Delfino Pescara 1936 players
Serie A players
Serie B players
Ekstraklasa players
Swiss Super League players
Czech First League players
Bohemian Football League players
Slovak expatriate footballers
Expatriate footballers in Italy
Slovak expatriate sportspeople in Italy
Expatriate footballers in Poland
Slovak expatriate sportspeople in Poland
Expatriate footballers in Switzerland
Slovak expatriate sportspeople in Switzerland
Expatriate footballers in the Czech Republic
Slovak expatriate sportspeople in the Czech Republic